Jeoselyna Rodríguez Santos (born December 9, 1991 in Santo Domingo) is a female volleyball player from the Dominican Republic, who won the bronze medal at the 2009 World Grand Champions Cup. She won the 2009 NORCECA Championship gold medal, bronze in the 2007 edition and the gold medal at the 2010 Central American and Caribbean Games playing with the Dominican Republic national team. She also won the gold medal at the 2010 Pan-American Cup and the silver at the 2009 and 2013 editions.

With her Junior National team, Rodríguez won the best server award at the 2007 FIVB Girls' U18 World Championship while her team finished 8th. She won the silver medal at the 2009 U20 World Championship and the 2013 U23 World Championship.

Career

2007
She competed for her native country at the 2007 FIVB Girls' U18 World Championship in Baja California, Mexico wearing the number #10 jersey. There she won the Best Server award and her team ended up in 8th place.

With the Dominican Republic women's national team. Rodriguez played as an opposite hitter. She claimed the bronze medal with the national squad at the 2007 NORCECA Championship.

2008
Jeoselyna played in the Salonpas Cup international tournament held in São Paulo, Brazil with CDN Mirador. Her team finished in the 5th place.

She started playing professionally overseas with the team West Side Stars, from Trinidad & Tobago. She helped her team to finish in 3rd place. Later that year, in Dominican Republic she became MVP in the 2008 Dominican Republic Volleyball League season.

2009
Early 2009, she signed with Indias de Mayagüez for the 2009 season of Puerto Rican league, Liga de Voleibol Superior Femenino.

After winning the silver medal with the Senior team in the 2009 Pan-American Cup, she also won the silver medal with the National Junior Team at the 2009 Women's U20 Volleyball World Championship, there she finished the second Best Scorer.

2010
Playing in Chiapas, Mexico with her National Senior Team she won the 2010 Final Four Cup gold medal.

For the 2010/2011 season, she joined CAV Murcia 2005 from the Spaniard Superliga, where she played with her fellow countrymates Prisilla Rivera and Marianne Fersola.

Jeoselyna became "Ideal Seven" from the 2010/2011 Superliga 7th journey.

2011
In the Spanish Queen's Cup, Jeoselyna's team, Murcia 2005 won Valeriano Alles Menorca in 5 sets; she contributed with 9 points to win the club's tournament.

Rodríguez joined Mirador to play at the 2011 FIVB Women's Club World Championship. Her team finished in 4th place after losing the Bronze Medal match to the Brazilian team Sollys/Nestle. She were also one of the Top Performers of the tournament with 25 points against Kenya Prisons.

2012
In September 2012, Rodríguez won the gold medal at the first 2012 U23 Pan-American Cup, played in Callao, Peru.

She signed with the Romanian professional club 2004 Tomis Constanța to play the 2012/2013 season in the Romanian league and the European Champions League. Rodríguez carried out her team, being the most offensive player. She led her team to a second place in the Romanian league and a ticked to the Challenge round of the CEV Cup, before leaving the team in the late December winter break along with Meagan Ganzer and Génesis Machado.

2013
In June, Rodríguez played at the Pan-American Cup winning the silver medal with her national team. She helped her national team to win the silver medal at the U23 World Championship, contributing to win its pool with a 4-1 record including a 7 aces match that topped all servers. They later had a 3-0 win over the USA team in the semifinals before falling 0-3 to China in the final match. She dominated the best server statistics while performing among the top scorers being awarded tournament's Best Opposite.

Rodríguez took part in the second Dominican participation at the World Grand Champions Cup, this time via wild card, taking with her national team the sixth place after their only victory to Thailand.

2014
In early 2014, Rodríguez joined the Peruvian league defending champion Universidad César Vallejo.

Clubs
 Mirador (2002–2004)
 Modeca (2005)
 Mirador (2006)
 Deportivo Nacional (2007–2008)
 Distrito Nacional (2007–2008)
 West Side Stars (2008)
 Centro (2009)
 Indias de Mayagüez (2009)
 Vôlei Futuro (2009–2010)
 Distrito Nacional (2010)
 CAV Murcia 2005 (2010–2011)
 Mirador (2011-2012)
 2004 Tomis Constanța (2012-2013)
 Universidad César Vallejo (2014)

Awards

Individuals
 2007 FIVB Girls' U18 Volleyball World Championship "Best Server"
 2008 Dominican Volleyball League "Most Valuable Player"
 2012 Copa Latina "Best Scorer"
 2013 U23 World Championship "Best Opposite"

National Team

Senior Team
 2007 NORCECA Championship -   Bronze Medal
 2009 FIVB World Grand Champions Cup -  Bronze Medal
 2009 NORCECA Championship -  Gold Medal
 2009 Pan-American Cup -  Silver Medal
 2009 Final Four Women’s Cup -  Bronze Medal
 2010 Final Four Women's Cup -  Gold Medal
 2010 Central American and Caribbean Games -  Gold Medal
 2010 Pan-American Cup -  Gold Medal
 2013 Pan-American Cup -  Silver Medal

Junior Team
 2006 NORCECA Girls Youth Continental Championship U-18 -  Silver Medal
 2008 NORCECA Women´s Junior Continental Championship U-20 -  Silver Medal
 2009 FIVB U20 Volleyball World Championship -  Silver Medal
 2012 U23 Pan-American Cup -  Gold Medal
 2013 U23 World Championship -  Silver Medal

Clubs
 2006 Dominican Republic Distrito Nacional Superior Tournament -  Champion, with Mirador
 2007, 2008 Dominican Republic Volleyball League -  Champion, with Distrito Nacional
 2010 Spanish Supercup -  Champion, with Murcia 2005
 2011 Spanish Queen's Cup  -  Champion, with Murcia 2005
 2010-11 Spanish Superleague -  Runner-Up, with Murcia 2005

References

External links
 FIVB Profile 
 Dominican Republic National Volleyball Federation

1991 births
Living people
Dominican Republic women's volleyball players
Dominican Republic expatriates in Brazil
Dominican Republic expatriates in Puerto Rico
Dominican Republic expatriate sportspeople in Spain
Dominican Republic expatriate sportspeople in Romania
Dominican Republic expatriates in Peru
Sportspeople from Santo Domingo
Central American and Caribbean Games gold medalists for the Dominican Republic
Competitors at the 2010 Central American and Caribbean Games
Dominican Republic expatriate sportspeople in Trinidad and Tobago
Expatriate volleyball players in the United States
Expatriate volleyball players in Brazil
Expatriate volleyball players in Spain
Expatriate volleyball players in Romania
Expatriate volleyball players in Peru
Central American and Caribbean Games medalists in volleyball